Foundation Stage is the British government label for the education of pupils aged 2 to 5 in England. In Northern Ireland, it is also used to refer to the first two years of compulsory education for pupils aged 4 to 6.

England
Foundation Stage 1 takes place in a pre-school / childcare environment such as Nursery between the ages 3 and 4 but is non-compulsory education. Foundation Stage 2 takes place in the Reception class of an Infant or Primary school between the ages 4 and 5. It is also known as Key Stage 0 to fit in alongside key stages 1 to 4. 

The introduction of a Foundation Stage was a significant landmark in education. The early years were given a distinct identity, and a more detailed, focused curriculum, where the emphasis is on learning through planned play activities.

In order for practitioners to plan a curriculum that will ensure attainment of the early learning goals for the majority of children at the end of the reception year, a series of stepping stones are provided. These stepping stones outline the evolving knowledge, abilities, comprehension, and attitudes kids will need if they're going to accomplish the foundation stage's objectives. 

For babies and children aged from birth to three, a separate framework named "Birth to Three Matters" was created to support those practitioners working with very young children and babies. Certain principles underpin the framework, for example, that parents and family are central to the well-being of the child, and that a relationship with a key person at home and in the setting is essential to young children's well-being. Most importantly, the framework emphasised that children learn most effectively when, with the support of a knowledgeable and trusted adult, they are actively involved and interested. In other words, children learn by doing rather than by being told.

Timeline
The Key Stages were  first introduction of the National Curriculum. 

The Qualifications and Curriculum Authority (QCA) published “Curriculum Guidance for the Foundation Stage” in 2000, and is the document upon which all Foundation Stage provision is planned, and which outlines the expected learning for pupils of this age. 

In 2007, a new curriculum combining the two frameworks (Foundation Stage and Birth to Three Matters) was introduced, with considerable training and support available to early years practitioners in all settings. This is called the Early Years Foundation Stage (EYFS) and became statutory in September 2008.

Structure

The guidance states that through well-planned play, both indoors and outdoors, children can:
 Explore, develop and represent learning experiences that help them make sense of the world
 Practice and build up ideas, concepts and skills
 Learn how to control impulses and understand the need for rules
 Be alone, be alongside others, or cooperate as they talk or rehearse their feelings
 Take risks and make mistakes
 Think creatively and imaginatively
 Communicate with others as they investigate or solve problems
 Express fears or relive anxious experiences in controlled and safe situations

The curriculum is organised into six areas of learning:
 Personal, social and emotional development
 Communication, language and literacy
 Mathematical development
 Knowledge and Understanding of the World
 Physical development
 Creative development

These six areas help practitioners to plan the learning environment and the activities provided within it, but this does not mean that children learn in these separate subject-based areas. Very often, a well-planned activity can promote children’s development and understanding in several areas simultaneously.

See also

 Key stage
 National Curriculum (England, Wales and Northern Ireland)

External links

The Foundation Stage Forum

School terminology
Educational stages